Hans Moser (in Romania known sometimes as Ioan Moser; born 24 January 1937 in  Timișoara, Romania) is a former Romanian-born German handball player and coach. He won two world championships as a player for the Romanian national team.

During his active player career, Moser, who is 1.92m tall, played as a center fielder.

In 2000, the official bulletin of the  International Handball Federation, World Handball Magazine, chose Moser as a member of the "Team of the Century", together with teammates Cornel Penu and Gheorghe Gruia.

Before beginning to play handball competitionally, he used to play water polo and volleyball (in the latter, he was even called up for the Romanian national team's training camp).

Moser studied at a vocational high school between 1952 and 1956. In Timișoara he played for Constructorul and Știința Timișoara (winning the field handball national championship in 1956).

After studying agronomy for three years in his hometown, he studied physical education at the Sports Institute in Bucharest (1960–1965). In Bucharest he played for Dinamo Bucharest.

He participated in four Men's World Championships: 1958, 1961, 1964, 1967.

In 1961, in West Germany, he became world champion with the Romania's national team. In 1964, in Czechoslovakia, besides becoming again world champion with the Romanian team, he was one of the three leading top scorers of the tournament. In the same year he was named "Best Handball Player in the World".

In 1964–1965, he won the EHF Champions League with Dinamo Bucharest.

In 1970, during the World Championship held in France, the French National Postal Service issued a stamp featuring Moser.

He played 224 games for the national team of Romania. He won eleven national championships (including three in field handball) with Dinamo Bucharest.

In 1968 he was allowed by the Romanian authorities to go to West Germany for six months as a playing coach for TV Milbertshofen. After the contract expired, he decided to defect. His wife and son, Richard, were visiting him at the time, so they decided to defect, too.

After he retired as an active player, he managed teams in Germany and Switzerland.

In 1996 he set up a series of businesses in Romania.

In 2004 he was investigated for forgery, use of forgery, and fraud. In 2008 he was sentenced by a court of law in Sighetu Marmației to one year and six months imprisonment, suspended for three and a half years.

He has been married four times, his last wife being Cuban. He has at least three children.

Awards and distinctions 
1961 Honored Master of Sports ("Maestru emerit al sportului")
 2007 Honorary citizen of Timișoara
 2009 Sports Merit Order, Second Class with bar

References 

Romanian male handball players
CS Dinamo București (men's handball) players
German male handball players
German handball coaches
Sportspeople from Timișoara
Banat Swabians
Romanian defectors
1937 births
Living people